Friedrich Wetter (born 20 February 1928) is a German cardinal of the Catholic Church. He was Archbishop of Munich and Freising, Germany, from 1982 to 2007. He was Bishop of Speyer from 1968 to 1982. He has been a cardinal since 1985.

Early life 
Wetter was born on 20 February 1928. He studied first in Landau and then from 1948 to 1956 at the Sankt Georgen Graduate School of Philosophy and Theology and at the Gregorian University in Rome, where he obtained a doctorate in theology. In 1953, he was ordained a priest in Rome by Cardinal  
Cardinal Clemente Micara.

He was a chaplain in Speyer from 1956 to 1958 and taught at the seminary there from 1958 to 1960. He was assistant parish priest for a year in Glanmünchweiler, and then taught as Professor of Fundamental Theology in Eichstätt from 1962 to 1967 and as Professor of Dogmatic Theology at the Johannes Gutenberg University of Mainz in 1967 for a year.

Bishop and cardinal 
On 28 May 1968, Pope Paul VI appointed him bishop of Speyer. He received his episcopal consecration on 29 June from Bishop Isidor Markus Emanuel, his predecessor in Speyer.

Pope John Paul II named him Archbishop of Munich and Freising on 28 October 1982 and he was installed there on 12 December.

While Archbishop of Munich and Freising, he chaired the Freising Bishops Conference and from 1981 to 2008 he chaired the faith commission of the German Bishops' Conference.

He was made a cardinal by Pope John Paul on 25 May 1985, with the title of Cardinal-Priest of Santo Stefano Rotondo. 

In October 2004 he protested that objections to the appointment of Rocco Buttiglione to the European Commission represented anti-Catholic bias, saying that Catholics like Konrad Adenauer, Robert Schuman, and Alcide de Gasperi, founders of the European Union, would now be excluded from its leadership. Buttiglione, a conservative Catholic nominated to handle issues of civil liberties and discrimination, had promised that his personal views would not interfere with his work, but members of the European parliament found his views on homosexuality and the proper role of women in society disqualifying.

He was one of the cardinal electors who participated in the 2005 papal conclave that elected Pope Benedict XVI.

Pope Benedict accepted his resignation on 2 February 2007. He continued there as apostolic administrator until the installation of Reinhard Marx as his successor on 2 February 2008.

The January 2022 report on the handling of cases of sexual abuse on the part of priests in the Munich archdiocese accused Wetter of "mishandling" 21 cases during his tenure as archbishop and administrator. Wetter defended his actions in detail and disputed much of the report; he admitted fault in one case in particular that the report addressed at great length. He apologized for failing to listen to victims of abuse and recognizing how abuse affected them and their families.

Works (selected) 
Die Trinitätslehre des Johannes Duns Scotus (= Beiträge zur Geschichte der Philosophie und Theologie des Mittelalters, file 41, H. 5), Aschendorff, Münster 1967, (Thesis of Habilitation, University of Munich, Munich, Theological Faculty, 28. Oktober 1965).

See also
Cardinals created by John Paul II

References

External links 

 
 

1928 births
Living people
Sankt Georgen Graduate School of Philosophy and Theology alumni
Academic staff of Johannes Gutenberg University Mainz
People from the Palatinate (region)
People from Landau
20th-century German cardinals
21st-century German cardinals
Pontifical Gregorian University alumni
Collegium Germanicum et Hungaricum alumni
Roman Catholic archbishops of Munich and Freising
Cardinals created by Pope John Paul II
Grand Crosses with Star and Sash of the Order of Merit of the Federal Republic of Germany
Members of the European Academy of Sciences and Arts
Roman Catholic bishops of Speyer